Vers-sur-Selle (literally Vers on Selle) is a commune in the Somme department in Hauts-de-France in northern France.

Geography

History
 Prehistoric times: single-sided flint tools and the remains of mammoths have been found in the local gravel.
 Neolithic period: some graves were discovered during building work.
 Middle Ages: Merovingian burials were found in the valley, the remains were unearthed during the construction of the A16.
In 1358, Vers was ravaged by Charles II of Navarre.
In 1376, three residents burnt down the tithe barn and were hanged in front of the church.
In 1426, the church and village were razed by English troops.
In 1472, Charles the Bold subjected Vers to "blood and fire".

 Before the revolution : in 1617, the leper hospital was closed.
In 1730, Nicolas Deleau, publican, was fined 75 sols for selling drinks on Sundays and feast days.

Population

Places of interest
 The sixteenth century church of Saint Rémi. The door dates from 1238. In 1472, the church was subjected to considerable devastation. Several restorations have since been made.

See also
Communes of the Somme department

References

External links

 Official website of Vers-sur-Selle 

Communes of Somme (department)